Tim Ritchie (born 10 January 1964) is a New Zealand cricketer. He played in 59 first-class and 31 List A matches for Wellington from 1982 to 1991.

See also
 List of Wellington representative cricketers

References

External links
 

1964 births
Living people
New Zealand cricketers
Wellington cricketers
Cricketers from Christchurch